Juan Pablo Jofre (also known as J.P. Jofre) (born 1983) is an Argentinian musician, composer, and arranger. He plays the bandoneon.

Life

J.P. Jofre was raised in San Juan, Argentina. He attended San Juan's Escuela de Música. He primarily was a drummer, and also studied the vibraphone, bassoon, piano, singing and double bass. He played in a heavy metal band. When he was seventeen, his uncle played a record for him by Astor Piazzolla and Jofre fell in love with the sound and style of the bandoneon.

In 2002 or 2003, he relocated to New York City with his mother and brother. His brother, who is deaf, struggled to find decent education in Argentina, but succeeded in finding it in New York, hence the relocation. He lives and works in Harlem in New York City.

Career

Upon learning the bandoneon, he was overwhelmed by how complex the instrument was. He used a piano to figure out the keys played by the bandoneon buttons, and read books. He eventually took lessons from Daniel Binelli. Jofre also started studying in Buenos Aires. He would take the bus for sixteen hours, twice a month, to take classes from Julio Pane. Jofre also composes his own music and has been called a "creative composer" by Paquito D'Rivera. His compositions range in genre and sound including jazz and pieces for string orchestras. In March, 2014, he debuted his Bandoneon Concerto with the Symphony Silicon Valley in San Jose, California. He has performed on Rosie Live. In July 2017, he performed in Minneapolis in the Mill City Summer Opera production of Ástor Piazzolla's "tango operita" María de Buenos Aires.

Hard Tango
His debut album, Hard Tango, was released in 2012. The album includes original compositions by Jofre, and is described as "classical-tango hybrid," by The New York Times. The album also features works by Astor Piazzolla, Fernando Otero, Leo Brouwer, and I Am the Walrus by John Lennon.

Discography

Hard Tango, 2012, Round Star
Be Like Water, 
Manifesto,

References

External links
"El bandoneón, mucho más que un instrumento para el argentino Juan Pablo Jofre" 
"From Solemn To Sizzling With JP Jofre and the Hard Tango Chamber Band"
"J.P. Jofre"

1983 births
Living people
People from San Juan, Argentina
Argentine tango musicians
People from Harlem